Oberbillig is a municipality in the Trier-Saarburg district, in Rhineland-Palatinate, Germany.

The municipality is situated on the Moselle river, a situation reflected in the design of its coat of arms.

There is a car ferry across the Moselle that connects Oberbillig in Germany to the city of Wasserbillig in Luxemburg.

History

The town's foundation dates back to the Roman era.
During the Middle Ages Oberbillig as well as the neighboring town of Wasserbillig used to be one community, called Billig and belonged to the grand duchy of Luxembourg until the two parts were split after the Vienna Congress. Oberbillig was handed over to Prussia, while Wasserbillig remained luxembourgish.
A small church building dates from 1864

From 18 July 1946 to 6 June 1947 Oberbillig, in its then municipal boundary, formed part of the Saar Protectorate.

See also

 Wasserbillig#Geography

References

Municipalities in Rhineland-Palatinate
Trier-Saarburg